Kenly Kiya Kato (born 1972) is a United States magistrate judge of the United States District Court for the Central District of California who is a nominee to serve as a United States district judge of the same court.

Education 

Kato earned her Bachelor of Arts, summa cum laude, from the University of California, Los Angeles in 1993 and her Juris Doctor, cum laude, from Harvard Law School in 1996.

Legal career 

Kato served as a law clerk for Judge Robert Mitsuhiro Takasugi of the United States District Court for the Central District of California from 1996 to 1997. From 1997 to 2003, she was a deputy federal public defender in the federal public defender's office in Los Angeles. From 2003 to 2004, Kato was an associate at Liner LLP in Los Angeles. From 2004 to 2014, she was a solo practitioner, representing clients in civil and criminal cases.

Federal judicial service

United States magistrate judge service 

On July 1, 2014, Kato was sworn in as a United States magistrate judge.

Nomination to district court 

On December 15, 2021, President Joe Biden nominated Kato to serve as a United States district judge of the United States District Court for the Central District of California. President Biden nominated Kato to the seat vacated by Judge Beverly Reid O'Connell, who died on October 8, 2017. On February 1, 2022, a hearing on her nomination was held before the Senate Judiciary Committee. During her hearing, Senator Chuck Grassley questioned her about an article she wrote while at Harvard Law School in which she said neoconservative Asian Americans "internalize the dialogue of oppressors, believing in the values of the status quo and condemning the activism of their group." Senator Ted Cruz questioned her about her views on affirmative action. On March 10, 2022, her nomination was stalled in committee by an 11–11 vote. On January 3, 2023, her nomination was returned to the President under Rule XXXI, Paragraph 6 of the United States Senate; she was renominated later the same day. On February 9, 2023, her nomination was reported out of committee by an 11–10 vote. Her nomination is pending before the United States Senate. If confirmed, Kato would be the third Asian Pacific American woman to serve on the Central District.

See also 
 List of Asian American jurists

References

External links 

1972 births
Living people
20th-century American women lawyers
20th-century American lawyers
21st-century American judges
21st-century American women lawyers
21st-century American lawyers
American jurists of Japanese descent
California lawyers
Harvard Law School alumni
Lawyers from Los Angeles
Public defenders
United States magistrate judges
University of California, Riverside alumni
21st-century American women judges